Thomas William Birkett (born 1952) better known as Bill Birkett is an English civil engineer, climbing writer, photographer, rock climber, and mountaineer, from the Lake District, Cumbria, who has undertaken many expeditions around the world. The 541 peaks of the lake district listed in one of his books are known as Birketts in his honor.

Early life and education 
Bill Birket was born on 13 May 1952 the son of pioneering Lake District climber Robert James 'Jim' Birkett. 

He grew up in Langdale and started climbing as a child, lead his first extreme graded climbs at the age of 16.

Birkett studied civil engineering at Teesside Polytechnic, graduating in 1976. He then went on to work for Cumbria County Highways. He joined the Institution of Civil Engineers in 1981 and gained chartered status.

Climbing

He has made the first ascents of a number of rock climbs including one of the first E7-graded climbs in Britain with Centrefold on Raven Crag Langdale in 1984. 

Birkett is a member Member of the Climbers' Club, the British Mountaineering Council, the Austrian Alpine Club the Fell and Rock Climbing Club, the Outdoor Writers and Photographers Guild, British Guild of Travel Writers and the Society of Authors.

Writing and photography
Birkett began writing and photographing for climbing magazines in the late 1970s, and in 1985 he became a freelance writer and photographer. 
Birkett's books have been published by a range of publishing companies including Cicerone Press, Oxford Illustrated Press, Constable,  Harper Collins, AA, David & Charles and Frances Lincoln. In 2009 he set up his own publishing company, Bill Birkett Publishing to "have complete control" over future walks books.

Awards and honours
Birkett has twice won Excellence awards from the Outdoor Writers and Photographers Guild for A Year in the Life of the Langdale Valleys in 2005, and A Year in the Life of the Duddon Valley in 2007.

A Year in the Life of the Duddon Valley also won the Dalesman Award for Best Outdoot book in 2007.

The Birketts 
The 541 hills listed in Birkett's book the Complete Lakeland Fells (1994) have become known as Birketts (see Hill lists in the British Isles) and are a popular list used as a target by Hill Baggers.

Publications 
Birkett has written or co-authored over 30 books, including:

 Winter Climbs In The Lake District (with Bob Bennet and Andy Hyslop, 1980, 3rd edition 1997)  
 Lakelands Greatest Pioneers, 100 Years of Rock Climbing (1983) 
 Classic Rock Climbs In Great Britain (1986) 
 Classic Walks In Great Britain (1987) 
 Rock Climbs In The Lake District (with Geoff Cram, Chris Eilbeck and Ian Roper, 1987) 
 Modern Rock and Ice Climbing (1988) 
 The Hillwalker's Manual (1988) 
 Classic Rock Climbs In The Lake District (1989) 
 Women Climbing, 200 Years of Achievement (with Bill Peascod, 1990) 
 Rock Climbing In Northern England (with John White, 1990) 
 Classic Rock Climbs In Northern England (1990) 
 Classic Rock Climbs In Southern England (1991) 
 French Rock (1993) 
 The Hillwalker's Manual, a Diffinative Source of Reference (1993) 
 Complete Lakeland Fells (1994) 
 Lakeland Fells Almanac (1997) 
 Great British Ridge Walks (1999) 
 Classic Treks: The 30 Most Spectacular Hikes in the World (2000) 
 Exploring The Lakes and Low Fells Vol. 1 (2001) 
 Exploring The Lakes and Low Fells Vol. 2 (2001) 
 50 Walks In The Lake District (with contributions by Jon Sparks and Vivienne Crow, 2002) 
 The English Lakes – Memories of Times Past (2006) 
 Scafell Portrait of a Mountain (2007) 
 A Year in the Life Series
 A Year in the Life of the Lamgdale Valleys (2004) 
A Year in the Life of Borrowdale (2005) 
A Year in the Life of Glencoe (2005) 
A Year in the Life of the Duddon Valley (2006) 
 A Year in the Life of the Isle of Skye (2008) 
A Year in the Life of Snowdonia (2009) 
 A Year in the Life of Buttermere (2009) 
 Walk Series
 Walk The Langdales (2009) 
Walk Ambleside, Rydal and Grasmere (2010) 
Walk Windermere & Hawkshed (2012) 
 Walk Borrowdale & Keswick (2014) 
Walk Ullswater & Patterdale (2021) 

He is a regular contributor to The Great Outdoors, Climber, Climb, On the Edge, High and Cumbria magazines.

Television 
Birkett appeared on the Chanel 4 series Yorkshire Dales and the Lake District (series 3, episode1, 2019) climbing the North West Arete on Gimmer Crag in Langdale with his daughter Rowan Birkett.

See also
List of Birketts in the Lake District

References

External links
 Website 
Twitter

Living people
1952 births
British nature writers
British rock climbers
British mountain climbers
Sportspeople from Cumbria
English male non-fiction writers
20th-century English male writers
21st-century English male writers
English non-fiction outdoors writers